Please is the debut studio album by English synth-pop duo Pet Shop Boys, released on 24 March 1986 by Parlophone in the United Kingdom and by EMI America Records in the United States. According to the duo, the album's title was chosen so that people had to go into a record shop and say "Can I have the Pet Shop Boys album, 'Please'?". Please spawned four singles: "West End Girls", "Opportunities (Let's Make Lots of Money)", "Suburbia", and "Love Comes Quickly"; "West End Girls" reached number one in both the UK and the US.

Background and composition

Please is musically simpler than, but lyrically just as rich as, Pet Shop Boys' later work. The instrumentals are comparable to other techno pop of this period. As with many early PSB albums, the lyrics were considered androgynous. The stories they contain being equally applicable to gay and heterosexual relationships. Tennant, in particular, enjoyed this ambiguity  and refused to comment on his own sexuality until he came out shortly prior to the 1993 release of Very.

The tiny cover photograph enclosed by a sea of white has been seen by some design observers as a reaction to the traditional album cover. With the new CD cases of the time being necessarily smaller than designs seen on 12" albums, the passport-sized photograph is far removed from standard cover artwork. The actual size of the image is the same size as a 35mm photographic negative.
Although some commentators have remarked that "Two Divided by Zero" samples a Texas Instruments Speak & Spell toy from the 1980s, this is a myth. Neil Tennant stated in an interview in the BBC Radio documentary About Pet Shop Boys that the sample used on "Two Divided by Zero" was in fact a talking calculator he had bought for his father. The calculator was a Sharp Elsi Mate model EL-640..

Please was re-released on 4 June 2001 (as were most of the duo's studio albums up to that point) as Please/Further Listening 1984–1986. The re-released version was not only digitally remastered but came with a second disc of B-sides and previously unreleased material from around the time of the album's original release. Yet another re-release followed on 9 February 2009, under the title of Please: Remastered. This version contains only the 11 tracks on the original. With the 2009 re-release, the 2001 two-disc re-release was discontinued. On 2 March 2018 a new remastered edition of Further Listening was released, with 2001 edition content.

"Suburbia" was dramatically remixed for the single release.

"Violence" was later re-recorded by the Pet Shop Boys for a charity concert at The Haçienda nightclub in the early 1990s. This version, known as the 'Haçienda version', was released as one of the B-sides to "I Wouldn't Normally Do This Kind of Thing" and was then made available on the B-sides album Alternative and the 2001 Further Listening re-release of the Very album.

The Pet Shop Boys later sampled the Please version of "Love Comes Quickly" for their song "Somebody Else's Business", which appeared on the Disco 3 album.

"Tonight Is Forever" was later covered by Liza Minnelli on the Pet Shop Boys-produced album Results.

Track listing

Notes
 "Opportunities" (reprise) is included on the LP version of the album as a hidden track before of the track "Tonight Is Forever", while appearing as a separate track on the CD version.
 Track 4 on the Further Listening 1984–1986 bonus disc is a previously unreleased mix, different from the actual 12″ version released in 1985 (dance mix) and which reappeared in 1986 (original dance mix).

Personnel
Credits adapted from the liner notes of Please.

Pet Shop Boys
 Chris Lowe – sequencer, synthesizer, keyboards, samples, programmer, drum programmer , piano , electric piano ,
 Neil Tennant – vocals, keyboards

Additional musicians
 Stephen Hague – keyboards, programmer
 Andy Mackay – saxophone 
 Helena Springs – additional vocals 
 Ron Dean Miller – guitar

Technical
 Stephen Hague – production
 David Jacob – engineering
 J. J. Jeczalik – production (original recording) 
 Nicholas Froome – production (original recording) 
 Ron Dean Miller – New York overdubs ; production (original recording) 
 Pet Shop Boys – production (original recording) 
 Blue Weaver – production (original recording)

Artwork
 Eric Watson – cover photograph, inner sleeve photographs
 Paul Rider, John Stoddart, Brian Aris, Joe Shutter, Ian Hooton, Chris Burscough – inner sleeve photographs
 Mark Farrow – sleeve design
 Pet Shop Boys – sleeve design

Charts

Weekly charts

Year-end charts

Certifications and sales

Notes

References

Bibliography

External links
 

1986 debut albums
Albums produced by Stephen Hague
EMI America Records albums
Parlophone albums
Pet Shop Boys albums